Markus Katzer (born 11 December 1979) is an Austrian former football player who played most of his games for Rapid Wien. He last played for First Vienna FC.

Club career
He began his career at ASK Erlaa from whom he transferred to FC Admira Wacker Mödling. He played there until 2004 when he moved to Rapid Wien with whom he won the league title twice and played in the UEFA Champions League.

He is a left wing-back.

Club statistics

Updated to games played as of 16 June 2014.

International career
He made his debut for Austria in an August 2003 friendly match against Costa Rica and was a participant at the EURO 2008.

National team statistics

Honours
Austrian Football Bundesliga (2):
 2005, 2008

External links
Official Website – Markus Katzer
Player profile – SK Rapid
Profile – EURO 2008

1979 births
Living people
Footballers from Vienna
Austrian footballers
Austria international footballers
UEFA Euro 2008 players
Association football defenders
FC Admira Wacker Mödling players
SK Rapid Wien players
First Vienna FC players
Austrian Football Bundesliga players